Lü Yue may refer to:

Duke Cheng of Qi (died 795 BC), ruler of Qi
Lü Yue (cinematographer) (born 1957), Chinese cinematographer and film director
Lü Yu'e (born 1960), Chinese cyclist

See also
Lui Lok (1920–2010), Hong Kong police sergeant with the same Chinese name as the cinematographer